Vijay is a Hindu male given name meaning 'Victory', and also a surname. Notable people with the name include:

Surname
A. L. Vijay (born 1979), Indian film director
Duniya Vijay (born 1974), Kannada actor
Murali Vijay (born 1984), Indian cricketer
Sanchari Vijay, national award winner Kannada actor

Given name

Academics
Vijay Bhargava (born 1948), Professor of Electrical and Computer Engineering, University of British Columbia
Vijay Prashad, Indian historian, journalist and political commentator
Vijay S. Pande (born 1970), Associate Professor of Chemistry and Structural biology, Stanford University
Vijaypal Singh (born 1945), scientist associated with the Indian Council of Agricultural Research

Armed Forces
Vijay Lall, Lt General, Indian Army (born 1942)

Film
Vijay (actor) (born 1974), Indian film actor and playback singer
Vijay (director), Kannada film director
Vijay Anand (filmmaker) (1925–2004), Hindi film producer, director, writer and actor
Vijay Deverakonda (born 1985), Indian Telugu film actor and producer
Vijay Kumar (filmmaker), debuted with Uriyadi
Vijay Sethupathi (born 1978), Indian film actor and producer

Music
Vijay Antony (born 1975), Indian music director
Krish (singer), Vijay "Krish" Balakrishnan (born 1977), Indian singer
Vijay Iyer (born 1971), American jazz pianist
Vijay Kichlu (born 1930), Hindustani singer
Vijay Madhavan, Indian classical dancer
Vijay Patil, known as Raamlaxman, Indian pianist and accordionist
Vijay Prakash (born 1976), Indian singer
Vijay Yesudas (born 1979), Indian singer

Politics
Vijay Anand (politician) (born 1969), Tamil Nadu State politician
Vijay Jolly (born 1960), BJP politician
Vijay Mallya (born 1955), Indian businessman and Member of Parliament

Sports
Vijay Amritraj (born 1953), former Indian tennis player
Vijay Bharadwaj (born 1975), Indian cricketer
Vijay Dahiya (born 1973), Indian cricketer
Vijay Hazare (1915–2004), captain of the Indian cricket team
Vijay Kumar (sport shooter) (born 1985), Indian professional shooter
Vijay Manjrekar (1931–1983), Indian cricketer
Vijay Mehra (Emirati cricketer) (born 1963), UAE cricketer
Vijay Mehra (Indian cricketer) (1938–2006), Indian cricketer
Vijay Merchant (1911–1987), Indian cricketer
Vijay Pal Singh (born 1967), Indian pole vaulter 
Vijay Rajindernath (1928–1989), Indian cricketer
Vijay Singh (born 1963), Fijian-Indian golfer

Other
Vijay Barse (born 1945), social worker from Nagpur

See also
Vijay (disambiguation)
Vijaya (disambiguation), alternative transliteration or female equivalent of Vijay
Vijayan (stunt coordinator), Indian action choreographer
Wijay (born 1982), Indonesian international footballer of Indian descent

Indian given names